Operophterini is a tribe of geometer moths under subfamily Larentiinae.

Species
 Epirrita Hübner, 1822
 Malacodea Tengström, 1869
 Operophtera Hübner, 1825
 Tescalsia Ferguson, 1994

References

External links

 
Larentiinae